Bartholomew Webb (born 1650) was an English organist.

Career
Webb was a chorister at Winchester Cathedral until 1666. He was appointed Organist of Chichester Cathedral in August 1668 He was also Master of the Choristers two months later.

See also
Organs and organists of Chichester Cathedral

Notes
 The last appointment as Organist prior to the suspension of cathedral services was Thomas Lewis

References

1650 births
English classical organists
British male organists
Cathedral organists
Year of death missing
Male classical organists